Obert Moyo (born 29 July 1985) is a retired Zimbabwean football defender.

References

1985 births
Living people
Zimbabwean footballers
Hwange Colliery F.C. players
Platinum Stars F.C. players
CS Don Bosco players
Zimbabwe international footballers
Association football defenders
Zimbabwean expatriate footballers
Expatriate soccer players in South Africa
Zimbabwean expatriate sportspeople in South Africa
Expatriate footballers in the Democratic Republic of the Congo
Zimbabwean expatriate sportspeople in the Democratic Republic of the Congo
Zimbabwe Premier Soccer League players
People from Matabeleland North Province